The men's 4 × 100 metre medley relay competition of the swimming events at the 1986 Commonwealth Games took place on 30 July.

Records
Prior to the competition, the existing world and championship records were as follows.

The following records were established during the competition:

Results

Heats
9 teams participated in 2 heats.

Final
The results of the final are below.

References

Medley relay 4x100 metre, men's
Commonwealth Games